Carlos Santos (born October 1, 1955 in Ceiba, Puerto Rico) is a former boxer from Puerto Rico, who represented his native country as an amateur at the 1976 Summer Olympics in Montreal, Quebec, Canada. There he was eliminated in the quarterfinals.  Santos was involved both in the first and the fourth world title bouts involving two Puerto Rican boxers in history. It has been suggested that Santos was not born in Ceiba but in the San Juan area named "Santurce", but it is widely believed that Santos is a Ceiba native.

Boxing career
Carlos Santos debuted as a professional boxer on November 11, 1976, outpointing José Collantes over four rounds in San Juan. He obtained his first knockout victory in his third fight, when he beat Juan Polanco in the third round on May 21, 1977.

Santos' first fight abroad came on November 4 of that year, when he beat Mario Valoy by a third-round knockout in Panama City, Panama. On April 8, 1978, he knocked Collantes out in the fifth round of their rematch.

After three more wins in Puerto Rico, Santos had a fight in the Dominican Republic, where he beat Mario Ramos by a knockout in the eighth round, on April 2, 1979. On his very next fight, Santos outpointed Felix Pagan Pintor, future trainer of Wilfredo Gómez, over ten rounds.

After beating Kid Flash by a third-round knockout on December 1 of that year in St. Thomas, United States Virgin Islands, Santos moved temporarily to Italy, seeking for attention from boxing executives as well as more celebrity than he had in Puerto Rico. On April 4, 1980, Santos made his European debut by knocking out Charles Petersen in the second round at Milan. Santos won seven fights in Italy, all of them by knockout. One curious fight happened on December 20 of 1980 in Turin: Santos was credited with beating Alfonso Hayman, a fringe contender of the era, in the first round. Hayman was under a medical suspension in Italy at the time, however, having been knocked out only eight days before Santos' fight, so his opponent that night is listed on his record as an "unknown opponent".

Carlos Santos made his United States debut on May 23, 1981, day in which Wilfred Benítez became the first Hispanic to be a three division world champion in history, when he knocked Raul Aguirre out in the fifth round as part of the Benitez-Hope fight's undercard.

Santos was 22-0 with 16 knockouts when he received his first world title shot. On November 14 of '81, he and Benitez made history by staging the first world championship bout between two Puerto Ricans, when they boxed in Las Vegas, Nevada. Benitez defeated Santos by a fifteen-round unanimous decision, retaining the WBC world Jr. Middleweight title in an HBO Boxing-televised bout.

Having lost his condition as an undefeated boxer, Santos returned to Italy, where he won four more bouts, three of them by knockout. After winning four additional fights, Santos had a second chance at becoming world champion. When he faced Mark Medal, a New York native who is also Puerto Rican, Santos became the first Puerto Rican boxer to face two Puerto Ricans in world championship fights. On November 2, 1984, at New York's Madison Square Garden and with Gómez among his fans, Santos dropped Medal in the first round, recuperated himself from a fourteenth round knockdown and became the IBF world Jr. Middleweight champion by beating Medal with a fifteen-round unanimous decision.

Santos retained the title on his first defense, outpointing Louis Acaries over 15 rounds on June 1, 1985 in Paris, France. A proposed second defense against Davey Moore was within days of taking place; Moore got injured and the fight never took place. Santos had to await little more than one year for his next fight.

On June 4, 1986, Santos defended his title for the second time, against Buster Drayton in East Rutherford, New Jersey. Santos lost the title by a fifteen-round majority decision.

On September 6, Santos was scheduled to meet another Jr. Middleweight. For an unknown reason, his rival did not show up,. The boxing undercard was being televised live across Puerto Rico, and a Heavyweight boxer, Melvin Epps, was brought in as a substitute. Santos, giving Epps more than 40 pounds and a considerable difference in height advantage, won the fight by a first-round knockout. On his next fight, Santos faced former world Welterweight champion Donald Curry for the USBA's regional Jr. Middleweight title at the Caesars Palace on the Las Vegas Strip. Santos was disqualified in the fifth round of his last major fight.

Santos won his last six fights, one of them in Casablanca, Morocco. On October 30, 1991, he beat Brinatty Maquilon by a ten-round decision in San Juan, announcing his retirement after that bout.

Carlos Santos had 40 wins and 3 losses in 43 fights, with 27 wins by knockout. He never lost a fight by knockout himself.

Personal life
During the 1980s, Santos moved to Italy for some time at the behest of manager Yamil Chade.  During a ten-year stay,  he also had a parallel career in modeling.  Upon his return to Puerto Rico, Santos began working for Pan American Grain. He retired after 25 years in the company, to receive treatment for  prostate cancer. Santos was cleared  of the condition in  August 2019.

See also

List of Puerto Ricans
List of Puerto Rican boxing world champions

References

External links
 

1955 births
Living people
People from Ceiba, Puerto Rico
Olympic boxers of Puerto Rico
Boxers at the 1976 Summer Olympics
Puerto Rican male boxers
Welterweight boxers